Frank Bank (April 12, 1942 – April 13, 2013) was an American actor, particularly known for his role as Clarence "Lumpy" Rutherford on the 1957–1963 situation comedy television series Leave It to Beaver.

Bank was cast in fifty episodes of Leave It to Beaver between  January 24, 1958, until the series finale on May 30, 1963. Thereafter, he was cast as Clarence Rutherford in 101 episodes of the series sequel, The New Leave It to Beaver, which aired on cable television from 1985 to 1989.

Beginning in 1973, Bank became a bond broker in his native Los Angeles. His autobiography, Call Me Lumpy: My Leave It To Beaver Days and Other Wild Hollywood Life, was published in 1997.

Bank died of cancer on April 13, 2013, in Rancho Mirage, California, one day after his 71st birthday.  He was survived by his third wife, Rebecca, four daughters, and five grandchildren. He is interred at Hillside Memorial Park Cemetery in Culver City, California.

Television roles
 Ford Television Theatre as Clarence Miggs in "Life, Liberty and Orrin Dooley" (NBC, 1952) 
Father Knows Best as unnamed high school student (uncredited) in "The Persistent Guest" (March, 1956)
Leave It to Beaver as Clarence Rutherford (CBS, ABC, 1958–1963)
Cimarron City as Henry Purdy (uncredited) in "The Bitter Lesson" (NBC, 1959)
Bachelor Father (1962) as Jim Estabrook in "The Twain Shall Meet" (ABC, 1962)
87th Precinct  as Punk (uncredited) in "Idol in the Dust" (NBC, 1962)
Life with Archie as Archie (unsold pilot, 1962)
The Match Game/Hollywood Squares Hour as himself (December 1983)Still the Beaver (CBS-TV film), subsequently known as The New Leave It to Beaver (1983–1989) – Clarence Rutherford

Films
 Cargo to Capetown (uncredited, 1950)
 The Story of Will Rogers as a young Will Rogers (1952)
 Leave It to Beaver'' (cameo, 1997)

References

Further reading

External links

1942 births
2013 deaths
Male actors from Los Angeles
Deaths from cancer in California
American memoirists
American male television actors
Jewish American male actors
20th-century American male actors
Writers from Los Angeles
People from Rancho Mirage, California
American male film actors
Burials at Hillside Memorial Park Cemetery
21st-century American Jews